Vadim Alexandrovich Chernobrov ( (1965, Volgograd Oblast – 18 May 2017, Moscow) was the founder and leader of the Kosmopoisk organisation. He was a ufology and mystery enthusiast, as well as a meteorite hunter. He conducted experiments which were supposed to involve time travel, starting in 1987.

References

External links
Vadim Chernobrov's site (in Russian)
The Mysteries of Time by V.Chernobrov (in Russian)
Article by Chernobrov in Pravda

Paranormal investigators
Ufologists
1965 births
2017 deaths